Stoney 142B is an Indian reserve of the Stoney Nakoda First Nation, comprising Bearspaw, Chiniki, and Wesley First Nations in Alberta, located within the Municipal District of Bighorn No. 8. It is 48 kilometres northwest of Calgary, Alberta, Canada.

References

Indian reserves in Alberta